This is a list of slapstick comedy topics. Slapstick is a type of broad physical comedy involving exaggerated, boisterous actions (e.g. a pie in the face), farce, violence and activities which may exceed the boundaries of common sense.

Slapstick comedians

 
 Fred Karno
 Roscoe "Fatty" Arbuckle
 Buster Keaton
Mack Sennett
Laurel and Hardy: Stan Laurel, Oliver Hardy
Abbott and Costello: Bud Abbott, Lou Costello
The Marx Brothers
 The Three Stooges members: Larry Fine, Moe Howard, Shemp Howard, Curly Howard, Joe DeRita, Joe Besser
 Peter Falk The In Laws
 Mel Brooks Silent Movie
 Woody Allen Scenes from a Mall
 Joe Roberts
 Neville Kennard
 Jaleel White 
 Peter Sellers
 Robin Williams
 Will Ferrell
 Harry Langdon
 Wayne Knight
 Harold Lloyd
 Benny Hill
 David Margulies
 Rik Mayall
 Ian McNeice
 Sacha Baron Cohen
 Rowan Atkinson
 Léonce Perret
 Charles Prince
 Louis de Funès
 Jerry Lewis
 Will Hay
 Abrahams and Zucker
 Sarah Duhamel
 Shim Hyung-rae
 Vivek
 Ritz Brothers
 Ton of Fun
 Norman Wisdom

Slapstick films

Slapstick films are a type of comedy film that employ slapstick comedy. For a list of slapstick films, see Slapstick films.

Techniques

 Eye poke
 Physical comedy
 Pieing
 Ice Bucket Challenge
 Gunge
 Slap
 Liver punch

See also
 Comedy film
 List of people who have been pied
 List of practical joke topics
 Physical comedy

Referenced

External links

Slapstick comedy
Slapstick comedians